{{safesubst:#invoke:RfD|||month = March
|day = 16
|year = 2023
|time = 09:29
|timestamp = 20230316092917

|content=
redirect rock Star

}}